Leucine zipper, down-regulated in cancer 1 like is a protein that in humans is encoded by the LDOC1L gene.

References

Further reading